Original Folk Blues is a compilation album by American bluesman John Lee Hooker, released in 1967.  It mostly features songs that Hooker recorded for Bernard Besman in Detroit, Michigan, between 1948 and 1954 the were originally issued by Modern Records.

Background
During the mid-1960s American folk music revival, there was increased interest in older blues music.  Chess Records responded with its The Real Folk Blues series of albums, which compiled earlier singles by several of its most popular blues artists, including Hooker. An article in Billboard magazine noted that Los Angeles-based Kent Records was "inspired by the recent success attained by Chess [in attracting] an audience of collegians and young blues fans". 

Kent part-owner Saul Bihari (also known as "Sam Ling" for songwriting royalties) explained that while contemporary rhythm and blues radio stations were ignoring older blues styles, many white musicians were seeking to "imitate the sounds of the early 'low down' blues artists like John Lee Hooker", which generated broader interest in the originals. To meet this need, the first releases in the Kent series included albums by Elmore James, Howlin' Wolf, Lightning Hopkins, Smokey Hogg, and Hooker.

Critical reception

In a review of a 2002 reissue by Ace Records, AllMusic reviewer Steve Leggett gave the album four out of five stars and wrote:

Track listing

Original album
Details are taken from the original Kent Records album liner notes and may differ from other sources. Since songwriting credits were not included, the 2002 Ace Records reissue liner notes are used for the songwriters. Except where noted, Hooker is listed for all songs, with additional credit given to original singles producer Bernard Besman.

Reissues
Original Folk Blues has been reissued by several record companies, including United/Superior Records and in 2002 by Ace Records, as an expanded album with six extra songs in addition to the twelve from the original release.

References

1967 albums
John Lee Hooker albums
Kent Records albums
Ace Records (United Kingdom) albums